Uncommon Women and Others (1977), is the first play by noted 20th-century American playwright Wendy Wasserstein.

Production history
The play was initially produced at Yale University in 1975, as Wasserstein's master's thesis.

The play premiered Off-Broadway in a production by the Phoenix Theatre on November 21, 1977 and closed on December 4, 1977 after 22 performances. It was directed by Steven Robman and performed at the Marymount Manhattan Theatre, New York.

The play was revived Off-Broadway by the Second Stage Theatre, in a production at the Lucille Lortel Theatre, running from October 26, 1994 to January 1, 1995. Directed by Carole Rothman, the cast featured Joan Buddenhagen (Leilah).

Characters and stage cast (1977)
Source: Lortel

Glenn Close - Leilah
Swoosie Kurtz - Rita Altabel
Jill Eikenberry - Kate Quin
Ellen Parker  - Muffet DiNicola
Ann McDonough - Samantha Stewart
Alma Cuervo - Holly Kaplan
Josephine Nichols  - Mrs. Plumm
Cynthia Herman - Susie Friend
Anna Levine - Carter
Alexander Scourby - Narrator (voice)

Plot summary
Alumnae of Mount Holyoke College (Wasserstein's alma mater) meet for lunch one day in 1978 and talk about their time together in college. The play is thus a series of flashbacks to the 1972-1973 school year as seven seniors and one freshman try to "discover themselves" in the wake of second-wave feminism.

Film

A made-for-television film was broadcast on the PBS Great Performances series in 1978, with all of the stage cast reprising their roles, except that Meryl Streep played Leilah.

Critical response
In reviewing the 1994 revival, Jeremy Gerard wrote in Variety that the premiere of Uncommon Women and Others was "a happy matching of a new writer with a gifted director and an amazing cast, all for a play that seemed to distill the conflicts and uncertainties of its time into a memorable blend of raunchy wit and sober apprehension...a new voice in the theater had an extraordinary debut."

References

Sources
Wasserstein, Wendy. The Heidi Chronicles, Uncommon Women and Others, & Isn't It Romantic. New York: Vintage, 1990. 
Wasserstein, Wendy.Uncommon Women and Others - google books

External links 
1977 Theater review - New York Times
Lortel listing, 1977
 College Honors Wendy Wasserstein '71 with Staged Reading

Uncommon Women and Others
Uncommon Women and Others
Uncommon Women and Others
Uncommon Women and Others
Uncommon Women and Others